George Miller may refer to:

Entertainment
George Miller (comedian) (1941–2003), comedian
George Miller (filmmaker) (born 1945), Australian film director, producer and screenwriter
George T. Miller (1943-2023), Australian film and television director
George Bures Miller (born 1960), Canadian artist
George Miller, stage name Joji (born 1992), a musician and Internet personality formerly known under the pseudonyms Filthy Frank and Pink Guy
George Miller (Lassie), a fictional character in the long-running television series Lassie

Politics 

George Funston Miller (1809–1885), U.S. Representative from Pennsylvania
George Clark Miller (1882–1968), mayor of Vancouver, British Columbia
George P. Miller (1891–1982), U.S. Representative from California
George Paul Miller (Wisconsin politician) (1868–1930), Wisconsin state senator and automobile dealer
George Miller (Arizona politician) (1922–2014), mayor of Tucson, Arizona 1991–1999
George Miller (California politician) (born 1945), former United States Representative from California's 11th congressional district
George Miller (New York politician) (1799–1883), New York lawyer, assemblyman, district attorney, county judge
George Miller Jr. (1914–1969), California Democratic politician, father of George Miller (California politician)
G. William Miller (1925–2006), U.S. Secretary of the Treasury, 1979–1981
George W. Miller (politician) (1922–1997), New York assemblyman

Sports 
George Miller (American football), American football coach
George Miller (baseball) (1853–1929), baseball player
George Miller (cricketer) (1929–2017), Scottish cricketer
George Miller (footballer, born 1886) (1886–?), Scottish footballer who played as a left half for Lincoln City
George Miller (footballer, born 1894) (1894–1939), Scottish footballer
George Miller (soccer, born 1927), South African footballer
George Miller (footballer, born 1939) (1939–2008), Scottish footballer and manager
George Miller (footballer, born 1980), Liberian footballer
George Miller (footballer, born 1991), English footballer
George Miller (footballer, born 1998), English footballer currently with Walsall F.C.
George Arthur Miller (1867–1935), British polo player

Science and architecture
 George Abram Miller (1863–1951), American mathematician
 George E. Miller (1919–1998), American medical educator
 George H. Miller (architect, born 1856) (1856–1927), American architect in Bloomington, Illinois
 George H. Miller (architect, born 1949), American architect in New York City
 George Armitage Miller (1920–2012), American psychologist
 George H. Miller (physicist), American physicist

Other 
 George Miller (historian) (1764–1848), Irish Anglican priest and historian of Trinity College, Dublin
 George Miller (Latter Day Saints) (1794–1856), bishop in the Latter Day Saint church
 George L. Miller (1830–1920), founder of the Omaha Herald newspaper
 George Macculloch Miller (1832–1917), lawyer and secretary of Cathedral of St. John the Divine in New York City
 George W. Miller (judge) (1941–2016), judge of the United States Court of Federal Claims
 George Stewart Miller (1884–1971), president of Tufts College, 1937 to 1938
 George D. Miller III (born 1951), president of Davis College in Johnson City, New York
 George Fuller Miller Sr. (1903–1980), Boy Scouts of America executive
 George D. Miller (born 1930), U.S. Air Force general

See also
Georges Miller (1906–1979), Luxembourgian wrestler
George Millar (disambiguation)
George A. Miller (disambiguation)